Cunninghame is a surname. Notable people with the surname include:

 John Cunninghame, Lord Cunninghame (1782–1854), Scottish lawyer
 William Cunninghame (1731–1799), Scottish tobacco merchant

See also
 Cunningham
 Cuninghame